Joyce Court (born June 12, 1931) is a Canadian former backstroke and freestyle swimmer. She competed in two events at the 1948 Summer Olympics.

References

External links
 

1931 births
Living people
Canadian female backstroke swimmers
Canadian female freestyle swimmers
Olympic swimmers of Canada
Swimmers at the 1948 Summer Olympics
Place of birth missing (living people)
20th-century Canadian women
21st-century Canadian women